The Diocese of Hasselt is a Latin Church ecclesiastical territory or diocese of the Catholic Church in Belgium. Comprising the whole of Belgian Limburg, the diocese was created in 1967 out of the Diocese of Liège. It is a suffragan in the ecclesiastical province of the metropolitan Archdiocese of Mechelen-Brussels. The cathedra is found within the St. Quentin Cathedral, Hasselt.

Bishops
 (1967–1989)
Paul Schruers (1989–2004)
Patrick Hoogmartens (2004–present)

Affiliated Bishops
Philip Dickmans (2008–present)

Notes

External links

Hasselt
Christian organizations established in 1967
Roman Catholic dioceses and prelatures established in the 20th century
Hasselt